Logan is an unincorporated community in Cullman County, Alabama, United States.

It is the location of the Shady Grove Methodist Church, which is listed on the National Register of Historic Places.

References

Unincorporated communities in Cullman County, Alabama
Unincorporated communities in Alabama